Topaze  is a 1951 French comedy film directed by Marcel Pagnol and starring Fernandel, Hélène Perdrière and Marcel Vallée. It is based on Pagnol's own 1928 play of the same name, which has been adapted for the screen  a number of times including a 1936 film directed by Pagnol.

It was shot at the Saint-Maurice Studios in Paris. The film's sets were designed by the art director Robert Giordani.

Cast 
 Fernandel as Albert Topaze 
 Hélène Perdrière as Suzy Courtois 
 Jacqueline Pagnol as Ernestine Muche 
 Marcel Vallée as M. Muche 
 Jacques Castelot as Roger Gaëtan de Bersac 
 Milly Mathis as La barone / The Baroness 
 Yvette Etiévant as La dactylo de Topaze / Topaze's typist 
 Robert Moor as Le vénérable vieillard 
 Rivers Cadet as L'agent de police 
 Marcel Loche as Un domestique 
 Pierre Larquey as Tamise 
 Jacques Morel as Régis Castel-Vernac

References

Bibliography
 Vincendeau, Ginette. The Companion to French Cinema. Cassell, 1996.

External links

1951 films
Films based on works by Marcel Pagnol
Films directed by Marcel Pagnol
1950s French-language films
French films based on plays
Gaumont Film Company films
French comedy films
1951 comedy films
French black-and-white films
1950s French films